Chen Chao-min (born 10 July 1940) was the Minister of National Defense of the Republic of China in 2008–2009.

Education
Chen studied at the War College of the Armed Forces University.

ROC Minister of National Defense

Resignation
Chen resigned from the Ministry of National Defense ministerial post with the other cabinet members of Executive Yuan following the slow disaster response after Typhoon Morakot hit Taiwan in August 2009.

See also
 Republic of China Armed Forces

References

1946 births
Living people
Kuomintang politicians in Taiwan
National Defense University (Republic of China) alumni
Politicians of the Republic of China on Taiwan from Changhua County
Taiwanese Ministers of National Defense